Ancaracra or Anka Raqra (Quechua anka black-chested buzzard-eagle or eagle, raqra fissure, crack, crevice, "eagle crack (or crevice)", also spelled Ancaracra) is a mountain in the northern part of the Cordillera Blanca in the Andes of Peru which reaches a height of approximately . It is located in the Ancash Region, Corongo Province, Cusca District. Ancaracra lies southwest of Gaico and southeast of Pacra.

Sources

Mountains of Peru
Mountains of Ancash Region